Sorbitan monooleate is a food additive with the E number E494.

References

E-number additives
Fatty acid esters